Kare language may be:
Kare language (Papuan)
Kare language (Bantu)
Kare language (Adamawa)